Lejbailat (also spelled Al Jubailat and Al Jebailat) is a district in Qatar, located in the municipality of Doha. It has a relatively higher elevation compared to the rest of Doha and provides a vantage point of West Bay, one of Doha's main commercial districts. Imam Muhammad ibn Abd al-Wahhab Mosque, Qatar's state mosque, is situated in the district.

Embassies
Lejbailat hosts the following embassies:
 Peruvian Embassy in Doha
 Uruguayan Embassy in Doha

Transport
Major roads that run through the district are Abdul Aziz Bin Jassim Street, Khalifa Street, Al Markhiya Street and Onaiza Street.

Demographics
As of the 2010 census, the district comprised 605 housing units and 53 establishments. There were 4,024 people living in the district, of which 52% were male and 48% were female. Out of the 4,024 inhabitants, 74% were 20 years of age or older and 26% were under the age of 20. The literacy rate was 98.4%.

Employed persons made up 57% of the total population. Females accounted for 40% of the working population, while males accounted for 60% of the working population.

Education
The following school is located in Lejbailat:

Gallery

References

Communities in Doha